The Searcy Municipal Courthouse, formerly the Searcy Post Office is a historic government building at Gum and Arch Streets in downtown Searcy, Arkansas.  It is a two-story brick building with Renaissance Revival styling.  The central bays of its main facade are articulated by paneled pilasters of the Corinthian order, with large two-story windows flanking a two-story entrance, all set in recessed segmented-arch openings.  The shallow hipped roof has elongated eaves with large brackets.  The building was designed by Oscar Wenderoth and built in 1914, and is the only high-style Renaissance Revival building in White County.

The building was listed on the National Register of Historic Places in 1992.

See also
National Register of Historic Places listings in White County, Arkansas

References

Courthouses on the National Register of Historic Places in Arkansas
Renaissance Revival architecture in Arkansas
Government buildings completed in 1914
National Register of Historic Places in Searcy, Arkansas
Courthouses in Arkansas
1914 establishments in Arkansas
Municipal courts